The list of ambassadors of France to Japan began developing in the same year that the American Commodore Perry "opened" Japan's doors to the West.

Franco-Japanese diplomatic relations were initially established during the Second Empire of French history and the Edo period of Japanese history.

List of heads of mission

Ambassadors of the Second Empire

Ambassadors of the Third Republic

Ambassadors of the Fourth Republic

Ambassadors of the Fifth Republic

See also
 Treaty of Amity and Commerce between France and Japan

Notes

References
 Auslin, Michael R. (2004).   Negotiating with Imperialism: The Unequal Treaties and the Culture of Japanese Diplomacy. Cambridge: Harvard University Press. ;  OCLC 56493769
 Halleck, Henry Wager. (1861).  International law: or, Rules regulating the intercourse of states in peace and war 	New York: D. Van Nostrand. OCLC 852699
 Medzini, Meron. (1971). French policy in Japan during the closing years of the Tokugawa regime. Cambridge: Harvard University Press. ;  OCLC 161422

The initial draft of this article was developed using material found at Ambassade de France au Japon in the French Wikipedia.

Japan
 
France